He Qifang (5 February 1912 – 24 July 1977) was a Chinese poet, essayist, literary critic and redologist. He was born in Wanxian, Sichuan Province, which is now Wanzhou District, Chongqing Municipality. He studied Philosophy at Peking University. Later in his life, he served as the director of the Institute of Literature at the Chinese Academy of Social Sciences.

Works 
 Stories of Not Fearing Ghosts, 1961

References

Republic of China poets
People's Republic of China poets
1912 births
1977 deaths
Poets from Chongqing
Republic of China essayists
People's Republic of China essayists
20th-century poets
20th-century essayists
National University of Peking alumni
Members of the Chinese Academy of Sciences
Redologists
Members of the 2nd Chinese People's Political Consultative Conference